Kallar-e Olya (also Romanized as Kallār-e ‘Olyā and Kalār-e ‘Olyā; also known as Kallār-e ‘Amūqolī and Kallār-e Bālā) is a village in Rig Rural District, in the Central District of Lordegan County, Chaharmahal and Bakhtiari Province, Iran. At the 2006 census, its population was 451, in 87 families.

References 

Populated places in Lordegan County